The 2022–23 season is Gabala FK's 18th season, and their 17th in the Azerbaijan Premier League, the top-flight of Azerbaijani football.

Season events
On 23 May 2022, Gabala announced the signing of Ilkin Qirtimov to a one-year contract from Shamakhi.

On 4 June, Gabala announced the signing of Salahat Aghayev to a one-year contract from Sabah.

On 16 June, Gabala announced the signing of Felipe Santos to a one-year contract, with the option of a second, from Shamakhi.

On 5 July, Gabala announced the signing of Fares Abu Akel to a one-year contract, with the option of a second, from Ashdod.

On 30 July, Gabala announced the signing of Ramon to a one-year contract from Neftçi.

On 10 August, Gabala announced the signing of Andriy Stryzhak to a one-year contract, with the option of a second, from Međimurje.

On 6 February, Gabala announced the signing of Ayyoub Allach to an 18-month contract from Virton.

Squad

Transfers

In

Friendlies

Competitions

Overview

Premier League

Results summary

Results by round

Results

League table

Azerbaijan Cup

UEFA Europa Conference League

Qualifying phase

Squad statistics

Appearances and goals

|-
|colspan="14"|Players away on loan:
|-
|colspan="14"|Players who left Gabala during the season:
|}

Goal scorers

Clean sheets

Disciplinary record

References

External links 
Gabala FC Website

Gabala FC seasons
Azerbaijani football clubs 2022–23 season